The Miss Ecuador 2007 was on March 22, 2007. There were 19 candidates for the national title. The Miss Ecuador 2007 represented Ecuador at Miss Universe 2007. Lugina Cabezas from Pichincha resulted as the winner, she was crowned by Katty López from Guayas.

Results

Placements

Special awards

Contestants

Notes

Returns
Last compete in:
 2004
  Imbabura

External links
https://web.archive.org/web/20070630215631/http://www.globalbeauties.com/news/2007/mar/ecuador.htm
http://foro.univision.com/univision/board/message?board.id=miss&message.id=1247137&page=1
http://archivo.eluniverso.com/2006/12/09/0001/1065/7E6794F2F4664160952B5FAA3AB1F168.aspx
https://web.archive.org/web/20071211210740/http://www.missecuador.net/candidatas2007/

Miss Ecuador
2007 beauty pageants
Beauty pageants in Ecuador
2007 in Ecuador